This is a list of all the players who have captained the Albania national football team.

List of captains
List of captaincy periods of the various captains throughout the years.

References

Captain
Albania captains
Association football player non-biographical articles